Kenneth Benard Gabriel (born July 3, 1989) is an American professional basketball player for Basket Brescia Leonessa of the Italian Lega Basket Serie A (LBA). At a height of 6'9" (2.05 m) tall, he plays at the power forward position. He played college basketball for the Auburn Tigers.

High school
Gabriel attended United Faith Christian Academy, in Charlotte, North Carolina, where he also played high school basketball.

College career
Gabriel played college basketball at Paris Junior College (NJCAA), and at Auburn (NCAA Division I), where he played with the Auburn Tigers. In his senior season, Gabriel averaged 12.2 points, 7.3 rebounds and 2.3 blocks per game and was named the team's MVP.

Professional career
On August 10, 2012, Gabriel signed his first professional contract with the Israeli League club Maccabi Ashdod. On November 20, 2012, he parted ways with Ashdod, after appearing in five games. In that season, he also played with AEL Limassol of the Cypriot League, and Taranaki Mountainairs of the New Zealand National Basketball League.

In the summer of 2013, Gabriel  signed for the Greek League club Rethymno Aegan, for the 2013–14 season.

On June 28, 2014, Gabriel signed a one-year deal to play in Turkey, with the Turkish League club Pınar Karşıyaka. In July 2015, he won the Turkish League championship with Karşıyaka, after his team beat Anadolu Efes 4–1 in the league's finals. On August 3, 2015, he re-signed with Karşıyaka, for one more season.

On August 8, 2016, Gabriel signed a two-year deal with Russian club Lokomotiv Kuban. On November 24, 2016, he left Lokomotiv and signed with Greek club Panathinaikos for the rest of the season.

On June 28, 2017, after having won both domestic titles with Panathinaikos, Gabriel renewed his contract with the Greek champions for three (1+1+1) years. His team option was declined on June 25, 2018, and he was compensated with a  buy-out.

On June 26, 2018, he returned to Turkey and signed with Türk Telekom. 

On October 28, 2019, the College Park Skyhawks, the G League team owned by the Atlanta Hawks, invited Gabriel to their training camp as an affiliate player. On December 20, Gabriel tallied 19 points, nine rebounds, three assists and one steal in a win against the Austin Spurs. He averaged  7.6 points and 4.8 rebounds in 20.1 minutes per game for College Park. On July 18, 2020, Gabriel signed with Mornar Bar of the ABA League and the Montenegrin League. He averaged 8 points and 2.8 rebounds per game. On July 23, 2021, Gabriel signed with Basket Brescia Leonessa of the Lega Basket Serie A.

Career statistics

EuroLeague

|-
| style="text-align:left;"| 2015–16
| style="text-align:left;" rowspan=1| Pınar Karşıyaka
| 10 || 10 || 27.4 || .622 || .326 || .900 || 4.6 || 1.3 || 0.8 || 0.7 || 9.7 || 10.7
|-
| style="text-align:left;"| 2016–17
| style="text-align:left;" rowspan=1| Panathinaikos
| 23 || 12 || 15.5 || .523 || .408 || .778 || 3.0 || 0.3 || 0.5 || 0.4 || 5.2 || 5.1
|-
| style="text-align:left;"| 2017–18
| style="text-align:left;" rowspan=1| Panathinaikos
| 33 || 1 || 11.1 || .607 || .288 || .333 || 2.4 || 0.2 || 0.3 || 0.3 || 2.9 || 2.5
|- class="sortbottom"
| style="text-align:left;"| Career
| style="text-align:left;"|
| 66 || 23 || 18.0 || .578 || .335 || .675 || 3.0 || 0.6 || 0.5 || 0.5 || 6.9 || 6.1

References

External links
FIBA profile
EuroLeague profile
Eurobasket.com profile
Greek League profile 
TBLStat.net profile
Auburn Tigers bio

1989 births
Living people
AEL Limassol B.C. players
American expatriate basketball people in Greece
American expatriate basketball people in Israel
American expatriate basketball people in Montenegro
American expatriate basketball people in Russia
American expatriate basketball people in Turkey
American men's basketball players
Auburn Tigers men's basketball players
Basketball players from Charlotte, North Carolina
College Park Skyhawks players
Karşıyaka basketball players
KK Mornar Bar players
Maccabi Ashdod B.C. players
Panathinaikos B.C. players
Paris Dragons basketball players
PBC Lokomotiv-Kuban players
Power forwards (basketball)
Rethymno B.C. players
Small forwards
Taranaki Mountainairs players
Türk Telekom B.K. players